Las Vega's may refer to:
 Las Vega's (Chilean TV series), 2013
 Las Vega's (Colombian TV series), 2016

See also
 Las Vegas (disambiguation)